Artyom Mikhailovich Blazhiyevsky (born 20 March 1994) is a Russian professional ice hockey defenceman. He is currently playing with Traktor Chelyabinsk of the Kontinental Hockey League (KHL).

Playing career
Blazhiyevsky made his Kontinental Hockey League debut playing with Torpedo Nizhny Novgorod during the 2014–15 KHL season.

In the following season he moved to perennial contending club, CSKA Moscow, and later won the Gagarin Cup in the 2018–19 season.

While in his seventh year with CSKA in the 2021–22 season, Blazhiyevsky made 34 appearances, posting 2 goals and 7 points through the mid-point of the campaign. On 27 December 2021, Blazhiyevsky was traded by CSKA Moscow to Traktor Chelyabinsk in exchange for Vitalii Abramov.

Awards and honors

References

External links

1994 births
Living people
HC CSKA Moscow players
Krasnaya Armiya (MHL) players
Russian ice hockey defencemen
Ice hockey people from Moscow
Torpedo Nizhny Novgorod players
Traktor Chelyabinsk players